This is a list of persons that are or were supporters or members of the Portuguese Communist Party.

General secretaries
José Carlos Rates (1923–?) — Carlos Rates was elected after the 1st congress, held in Lisbon in 1923. He was chosen to General Secretary by the delegate of the Communist International in Portugal, Jules Humbert-Droz, after several problems inside the newly founded Party. Later, Bento António Gonçalves would become the Party's General Secretary and criticize Rates' work as the leader of PCP.
Bento António Gonçalves (1929–1942) — Elected in 1929, Bento Gonçalves was born in Montalegre, near Bragança, in the North of Portugal. In September 1928 he joined the Portuguese Communist Party and became a member of the cell of the Arsenal of Alfeite. In 1929 he participated in the reorganizing conference that adapted the Party to its illegal status after the military coup of 1926. Soon after, he became Secretary General. He was arrested several times by the political police and sent to the Tarrafal concentration camp, where he died in 1942.
Álvaro Barreirinhas Cunhal (1961–1992) — Álvaro Cunhal (1913–2005) is considered one of the most influential personalities of the Portuguese 20th Century. Cunhal joined the PCP in 1931 and rapidly became one of the leading members of the Party. Cunhal was elected in 1961 after escaping from the prison in 1960. After the Carnation Revolution he returned and had a major role in the revolutionary process, being minister of several provisional governments. Cunhal had a degree in Law, but was also a writer and a painter. He died in June 2005 and his funeral was attended by an estimated 250.000 people.
Carlos Alberto Carvalhas (1992–2004) — Elected in 1992 after being elected assistant General Secretary in the 13th congress, in 1990. Carvalhas (b. 1941) is an economist. After participating in several protests and campaigns against the dictatorship, he became a member of the provisional governments after the Carnation Revolution in 1974/75 with the tasks of the employment. In the 1980s he was member of the European Parliament and of the Council of Europe. In 1991 he was the Party's candidate to the presidential election. He was later a member of the Portuguese Parliament for several years.
Jerónimo Carvalho de Sousa (2004–) — Elected after the 17th Congress in 2004, Jerónimo de Sousa (b. 1947) is a former metallurgical worker and still member of the metallurgical workers' union. He was member of the Constituent Assembly and of the subsequent Parliaments and was noted for being among the few MPs with working-class origins, a strange fact at the time, and also today. Jerónimo was also the Party's presidential candidate in 1996, but left the race giving his support to the Socialist candidate Jorge Sampaio. He was chosen again as presidential candidate again to the election of 2006.

Artists
Adriano Correia de Oliveira
Carlos Paredes
Fernanda Lapa
Fernando Lopes Graça
José Dias Coelho
Manuel Freire
Siza Vieira

Writers
Alves Redol
Ary dos Santos
Augusto da Costa Dias
José Gomes Ferreira
José Saramago
Miguel Urbano Rodrigues
Orlando Costa
Soeiro Pereira Gomes
Urbano Tavares Rodrigues
Francisco Miguel Duarte

Anti-fascist resistants
Alfredo Dinis
Ângelo Veloso
António Dias Lourenço
Alves Redol
Catarina Eufémia
José Casanova
José Vitoriano
Júlio Fogaça
Militão Ribeiro
Octávio Pato
Virgínia Moura

Academics
Bento de Jesus Caraça
José Barata-Moura
Mário Sacramento
Carlos Aboim Inglez

Trade unionists
Arménio Carlos
Manuel Carvalho da Silva

Others
Abílio Fernandes
António Simões de Abreu
Ilda Figueiredo
Miguel Madeira
Odete Santos
Alexís Jasek
Grégory Jerome Jasek
Pedro Guerreiro
Sérgio Ribeiro
Vasco Gonçalves

Portuguese Communist Party

Communists
Portuguese Communists